The Škoda Fabia S2000 is a Super 2000 rally car built by Škoda Motorsport. It is based upon the Škoda Fabia road car.

History
It made its début at Rallye Monte Carlo 2009,  with factory team Škoda Motorsport and drivers Jan Kopecký and Juho Hänninen. The car appeared as fast as Hänninen was leading until a crash. Biggest success of the Fabia S2000 is Hänninen's IRC title with title in manufacturers for Škoda.
Škoda Fabia S2000 won many national and international rally titles. Juho Hänninen won IRC in 2010, Andreas Mikkelsen won IRC in 2011 and 2012, Škoda became manufacturers champion in seasons 2010, 2011 and 2012. Juho Hänninen also won SWRC in 2011 In national championships in 2009 it was Pavel Valoušek in Czech Rally Championship, Matthias Kahle in Germany, Alberto Hevia in Spain, Raimund Baumschlager in Austria, Jozef Béreš in Slovakia and Roger Feghali in Lebanon. In 2010 it was Roman Kresta in Czech Republic, Jozef Béreš in Slovakia, Piero Longhi in Slovenia, Dimitar Iliev in Bulgaria and Andreas Mikkelsen in Italian Gravel Championship. The year of 2012 brought even more titles for Škoda Fabia S2000 including ERC for Juho Hänninen, Chris Atkinson won APRC, Škoda won manufacturers title in APRC, Jan Kopecký won in Czech, Mark Wallenwein in Germany, Raimund Baumschlager in Austria, Luca Rossetti in Turkey, Aleks Humar in Slovenia and Dimitar Iliev in Bulgaria.

PWRC victories
{|class="wikitable" style="font-size: 95%; "
! No.
! Event
! Season
! Driver
! Co-driver
|-
|  style="text-align:right; padding-right:0.5em;"| 1
|  2009 Rally Norway
| style="text-align:center;" rowspan="3"| 2009
|  Patrik Sandell
|  Emil Axelsson
|-
|  style="text-align:right; padding-right:0.5em;"| 2
|  2009 Cyprus Rally
|  Patrik Sandell
|  Emil Axelsson
|-
|  style="text-align:right; padding-right:0.5em;"| 3
|  2009 Acropolis Rally
|  Lambros Athanassoulas
|  Nikolaos Zakheos
|}

SWRC/WRC-2 victories
{|class="wikitable" style="font-size: 95%; "
! No.
! Event
! Season
! Driver
! Co-driver
|-
|  style="text-align:right; padding-right:0.5em;"| 1
|  2010 Rally Sweden
| style="text-align:center;" rowspan="5"| 2010
|  Per-Gunnar Andersson
|  Anders Fredriksson
|-
|  style="text-align:right; padding-right:0.5em;"| 2
|  2010 Rally Finland
|  Juho Hänninen
|  Mikko Markkula
|-
|  style="text-align:right; padding-right:0.5em;"| 3
|  2010 Rallye Deutschland
|  Patrik Sandell
|  Emil Axelsson
|-
|  style="text-align:right; padding-right:0.5em;"| 4
|  2010 Rallye de France
|  Patrik Sandell
|  Emil Axelsson
|-
|  style="text-align:right; padding-right:0.5em;"| 5
|  2010 Wales Rally GB
|  Andreas Mikkelsen
|  Ola Floene
|-
|  style="text-align:right; padding-right:0.5em;"| 6
|  2011 Acropolis Rally
| style="text-align:center;" rowspan="3"| 2011
|  Juho Hänninen
|  Mikko Markkula
|-
|  style="text-align:right; padding-right:0.5em;"| 7
|  2011 Rally Finland
|  Juho Hänninen
|  Mikko Markkula
|-
|  style="text-align:right; padding-right:0.5em;"| 8
|  2011 Rally Catalunya
|  Juho Hänninen
|  Mikko Markkula
|-
|  style="text-align:right; padding-right:0.5em;"| 9
|  2012 Rally de Portugal
| style="text-align:center;" rowspan="2"| 2012
|  Hayden Paddon
|  John Kennard
|-
|  style="text-align:right; padding-right:0.5em;"| 10
|  2012 Rally New Zealand
|  Hayden Paddon
|  John Kennard
|-
|  style="text-align:right; padding-right:0.5em;"| 11
|  2013 Monte Carlo Rally
| style="text-align:center;" rowspan="2"| 2013
|  Sepp Wiegand
|  Frank Christian
|-
|  style="text-align:right; padding-right:0.5em;"| 12
|  2013 Rally de Portugal
|  Esapekka Lappi
|  Janne Ferm
|-
|  style="text-align:right; padding-right:0.5em;"| 13
|  2015 Wales Rally GB
| style="text-align:center;"| 2015
|  Teemu Suninen
|  Mikko Markkula
|}

IRC victories
{|class="wikitable" style="font-size: 95%; "
! No.
! Event
! Season
! Driver
! Co-driver
|-
|  style="text-align:right; padding-right:0.5em;"| 1
|  2009 Rally Russia
| style="text-align:center;" rowspan="4"| 2009
|  Juho Hänninen
|  Mikko Markkula
|-
|  style="text-align:right; padding-right:0.5em;"| 2
|  2009 Barum Rally Zlín
|  Jan Kopecký
|  Petr Starý
|-
|  style="text-align:right; padding-right:0.5em;"| 3
|  2009 Rally Príncipe de Asturias
|  Jan Kopecký
|  Petr Starý
|-
|  style="text-align:right; padding-right:0.5em;"| 4
|  2009 Rally Scotland
|  Guy Wilks
|  Phil Pugh
|-
|  style="text-align:right; padding-right:0.5em;"| 5
|  2010 Rally Argentina
| style="text-align:center;" rowspan="7"| 2010
|  Juho Hänninen
|  Mikko Markkula
|-
|  style="text-align:right; padding-right:0.5em;"| 6
|  2010 Rally Islas Canarias
|  Jan Kopecký
|  Petr Starý
|-
|  style="text-align:right; padding-right:0.5em;"| 7
|  2010 Rally d'Italia Sardegna
|  Juho Hänninen
|  Mikko Markkula
|-
|  style="text-align:right; padding-right:0.5em;"| 8
|  2010 Ypres Rally
|  Freddy Loix
|  Frederic Miclotte
|-
|  style="text-align:right; padding-right:0.5em;"| 9
|  2010 Rali Vinho da Madeira
|  Freddy Loix
|  Frederic Miclotte
|-
|  style="text-align:right; padding-right:0.5em;"| 10
|  2010 Czech Rally
|  Freddy Loix
|  Frederic Miclotte
|-
|  style="text-align:right; padding-right:0.5em;"| 11
|  2010 Rally Scotland
|  Juho Hänninen
|  Mikko Markkula
|-
|  style="text-align:right; padding-right:0.5em;"| 12
|  2011 Rally Islas Canarias
| style="text-align:center;" rowspan="8"| 2011
|  Juho Hänninen
|  Mikko Markkula
|-
|  style="text-align:right; padding-right:0.5em;"| 13
|  2011 Prime Yalta Rally
|  Juho Hänninen
|  Mikko Markkula
|-
|  style="text-align:right; padding-right:0.5em;"| 14
|  2011 Ypres Rally
|  Freddy Loix
|  Frederic Miclotte
|-
|  style="text-align:right; padding-right:0.5em;"| 15
|  2011 Rally Azores
|  Juho Hänninen
|  Mikko Markkula
|-
|  style="text-align:right; padding-right:0.5em;"| 16
|  2011 Czech Rally
|  Jan Kopecký
|  Petr Starý
|-
|  style="text-align:right; padding-right:0.5em;"| 17
|  2011 Mecsek Rallye
|  Jan Kopecký
|  Petr Starý
|-
|  style="text-align:right; padding-right:0.5em;"| 18
|  2011 Rally Scotland
|  Andreas Mikkelsen
|  Ola Fløene
|-
|  style="text-align:right; padding-right:0.5em;"| 19
|  2011 Cyprus Rally
|  Andreas Mikkelsen
|  Ola Fløene
|-
|  style="text-align:right; padding-right:0.5em;"| 20
|  2012 Rallye Açores
| style="text-align:center;" rowspan="8"| 2012
|  Andreas Mikkelsen
|  Ola Fløene
|-
|  style="text-align:right; padding-right:0.5em;"| 21
|  2012 Rally Islas Canarias
|  Jan Kopecký
|  Petr Starý
|-
|  style="text-align:right; padding-right:0.5em;"| 22
|  2012 Circuit of Ireland
|  Juho Hänninen
|  Mikko Markkula
|-
|  style="text-align:right; padding-right:0.5em;"| 23
|  2012 Targa Florio Rally
|  Jan Kopecký
|  Petr Starý
|-
|  style="text-align:right; padding-right:0.5em;"| 24
|  2012 Ypres Rally
|  Juho Hänninen
|  Mikko Markkula
|-
|  style="text-align:right; padding-right:0.5em;"| 25
|  2012 Rally Romania
|  Andreas Mikkelsen
|  Ola Fløene
|-
|  style="text-align:right; padding-right:0.5em;"| 26
|  2012 Czech Rally
|  Juho Hänninen
|  Mikko Markkula
|-
|  style="text-align:right; padding-right:0.5em;"| 27
|  2012 Rally Sliven
|  Dimitar Iliev
|  Yanaki Yanakiev
|}

ERC victories
{|class="wikitable" style="font-size: 95%; "
! No.
! Event
! Season
! Driver
! Co-driver
|-
|  style="text-align:right; padding-right:0.5em;"| 1
|  2010 Ypres Rally
| style="text-align:center;" rowspan="2"| 2010
|  Jan Kopecký
|  Petr Starý
|-
|  style="text-align:right; padding-right:0.5em;"| 2
|  2010 Rali Vinho da Madeira
|  Jan Kopecký
|  Petr Starý
|-
|  style="text-align:right; padding-right:0.5em;"| 3
|  2011 Rallye du Valais
| style="text-align:center;"| 2011
|  Antonín Tlusťák
|  Jan Škaloud
|-
|  style="text-align:right; padding-right:0.5em;"| 4
|  2012 Jänner Rallye
| style="text-align:center;" rowspan="7"| 2012
|  Jan Kopecký
|  Petr Starý
|-
|  style="text-align:right; padding-right:0.5em;"| 5
|  2012 Croatia Rally
|  Juho Hänninen
|  Mikko Markkula
|-
|  style="text-align:right; padding-right:0.5em;"| 6
|  2012 Rally Bulgaria
|  Dimitar Iliev
|  Yanaki Yanakiev
|-
|  style="text-align:right; padding-right:0.5em;"| 7
|  2012 Ypres Rally
|  Juho Hänninen
|  Mikko Markkula
|-
|  style="text-align:right; padding-right:0.5em;"| 8
|  2012 Bosphorus Rally
|  Juho Hänninen
|  Mikko Markkula
|-
|  style="text-align:right; padding-right:0.5em;"| 9
|  2012 Czech Rally
|  Juho Hänninen
|  Mikko Markkula
|-
|  style="text-align:right; padding-right:0.5em;"| 10
|  2012 Rally Poland
|  Esapekka Lappi
|  Janne Ferm
|-
|  style="text-align:right; padding-right:0.5em;"| 11
|  2013 Internationale Jänner Rallye
| style="text-align:center;" rowspan="8"| 2013
|  Jan Kopecký
|  Pavel Dresler
|-
|  style="text-align:right; padding-right:0.5em;"| 12
|  2013 Rally Islas Canarias
|  Jan Kopecký
|  Pavel Dresler
|-
|  style="text-align:right; padding-right:0.5em;"| 13
|  2013 Rallye Açores
|  Jan Kopecký
|  Pavel Dresler
|-
|  style="text-align:right; padding-right:0.5em;"| 14
|  2013 Ypres Rally
|  Freddy Loix
|  Frédéric Miclotte
|-
|  style="text-align:right; padding-right:0.5em;"| 15
|  2013 Sibiu Rally Romania
|  Jan Kopecký
|  Pavel Dresler
|-
|  style="text-align:right; padding-right:0.5em;"| 16
|  2013 Barum Czech Rally Zlín
|  Jan Kopecký
|  Pavel Dresler
|-
|  style="text-align:right; padding-right:0.5em;"| 17
|  2013 Croatia Rally
|  Jan Kopecký
|  Pavel Dresler
|-
|  style="text-align:right; padding-right:0.5em;"| 18
|  2013 Rallye International du Valais
|  Esapekka Lappi
|  Janne Ferm
|-
|  style="text-align:right; padding-right:0.5em;"| 19
|  2014 Rally Liepāja–Ventspils
| style="text-align:center;" rowspan="4"| 2014
|  Esapekka Lappi
|  Janne Ferm
|-
|  style="text-align:right; padding-right:0.5em;"| 20
|  2014 Circuit of Ireland
|  Esapekka Lappi
|  Janne Ferm
|-
|  style="text-align:right; padding-right:0.5em;"| 21
|  2014 Ypres Rally
|  Freddy Loix
|  Johan Gitsels
|-
|  style="text-align:right; padding-right:0.5em;"| 22
|  2014 Rallye International du Valais
|  Esapekka Lappi
|  Janne Ferm
|-
|}

Gallery

See also
Škoda Motorsport IRC results

External links

Super 2000 cars
Fabia S2000
Cars introduced in 2009
2010s cars
All-wheel-drive vehicles
Cars of the Czech Republic